Kalari Vikraman is an unreleased Indian Malayalam-language film directed by Deepak Mohan, starring Mukesh and Vidya Balan . This is one of the earlier films of Vidya Balan  that was never released.

Plot

Kunju lakshmi and her grand father Moose lives in their old property and Moose does the living by treating snake bitten people. He never charges them and see it as a cause, so their life is also a struggle due to financial issues, but the people are always there to support them. Kadaikkinukkattu family aim for Moose's property but loses the court battle on the same. They hatch a plot against Moose and Kunju lakshmi with assistance from police as well. Now the people tries to bring a savior ( Kalari Vikraman ) to protect Moose, but he is serving a jail term. Will he able to fight for Kunju lakshmi and Moose form the climax.

Cast

Unreleased

The film is yet to have a theatrical release as the makers abandoned the project due to financial issues even though the film is almost complete.
Vidya Balan's name was mentioned as Vidya Iyer in news & promotional materials.

References

External links
 

2003 films
2000s Malayalam-language films
Unreleased Malayalam-language films